This is a partial list of unnumbered minor planets for principal provisional designations assigned during 1–15 September 2004. Since this period yielded a high number of provisional discoveries, it is further split into several standalone pages. , a total of 348 bodies remain unnumbered for this period. Objects for this year are listed on the following pages: A–B · C · D–E · F · G–H · J–O · P–Q · Ri · Rii · Riii · S · Ti · Tii · Tiii · Tiv · U–V · W–X and Y. Also see previous and next year.

R 

|- id="2004 RB300" bgcolor=#d6d6d6
| 0 ||  || MBA-O || 16.23 || 3.2 km || multiple || 2001–2021 || 30 Oct 2021 || 153 || align=left | Disc.: SpacewatchAdded on 21 August 2021Alt.: 2010 OX12, 2010 OQ17 || 
|- id="2004 RF300" bgcolor=#E9E9E9
| 0 ||  || MBA-M || 18.25 || data-sort-value="0.94" | 940 m || multiple || 2000–2021 || 09 Nov 2021 || 73 || align=left | — || 
|- id="2004 RR300" bgcolor=#d6d6d6
| 0 ||  || MBA-O || 16.5 || 2.8 km || multiple || 2004–2021 || 05 Jan 2021 || 180 || align=left | Alt.: 2008 HD23 || 
|- id="2004 RK301" bgcolor=#E9E9E9
| 0 ||  || MBA-M || 17.73 || 1.2 km || multiple || 2004–2021 || 06 Nov 2021 || 108 || align=left | — || 
|- id="2004 RL301" bgcolor=#E9E9E9
| 1 ||  || MBA-M || 18.2 || data-sort-value="0.68" | 680 m || multiple || 2000–2020 || 20 Jul 2020 || 60 || align=left | Disc.: SpacewatchAdded on 13 September 2020Alt.: 2016 NC43 || 
|- id="2004 RO301" bgcolor=#E9E9E9
| 0 ||  || MBA-M || 17.63 || data-sort-value="0.89" | 890 m || multiple || 2004–2021 || 08 Dec 2021 || 48 || align=left | — || 
|- id="2004 RQ301" bgcolor=#d6d6d6
| 0 ||  || MBA-O || 16.33 || 3.0 km || multiple || 2004–2021 || 07 Apr 2021 || 159 || align=left | — || 
|- id="2004 RS301" bgcolor=#fefefe
| 0 ||  || MBA-I || 18.61 || data-sort-value="0.56" | 560 m || multiple || 2002–2021 || 07 Apr 2021 || 65 || align=left | Alt.: 2017 DR1 || 
|- id="2004 RX301" bgcolor=#fefefe
| 0 ||  || MBA-I || 18.89 || data-sort-value="0.50" | 500 m || multiple || 2004–2021 || 15 Apr 2021 || 47 || align=left | — || 
|- id="2004 RG302" bgcolor=#fefefe
| 1 ||  || MBA-I || 18.7 || data-sort-value="0.54" | 540 m || multiple || 2002–2016 || 14 Jan 2016 || 34 || align=left | —Added on 22 July 2020 || 
|- id="2004 RL302" bgcolor=#E9E9E9
| 0 ||  || MBA-M || 17.37 || 1.9 km || multiple || 2004–2021 || 14 May 2021 || 54 || align=left | — || 
|- id="2004 RM302" bgcolor=#fefefe
| 0 ||  || MBA-I || 18.1 || data-sort-value="0.71" | 710 m || multiple || 2004–2019 || 03 Oct 2019 || 47 || align=left | Alt.: 2015 RL5 || 
|- id="2004 RN302" bgcolor=#d6d6d6
| 0 ||  || MBA-O || 17.5 || 1.8 km || multiple || 2003–2021 || 30 Nov 2021 || 36 || align=left | Disc.: SpacewatchAdded on 29 January 2022 || 
|- id="2004 RP302" bgcolor=#E9E9E9
| 2 ||  || MBA-M || 18.78 || data-sort-value="0.52" | 520 m || multiple || 2004–2021 || 29 Nov 2021 || 27 || align=left | — || 
|- id="2004 RR302" bgcolor=#FA8072
| 0 ||  || MCA || 19.61 || data-sort-value="0.36" | 360 m || multiple || 2004–2021 || 06 Nov 2021 || 74 || align=left | Disc.: SpacewatchAdded on 30 September 2021Alt.: 2011 UK477 || 
|- id="2004 RB303" bgcolor=#d6d6d6
| 0 ||  || MBA-O || 17.4 || 1.8 km || multiple || 2004–2020 || 14 Dec 2020 || 38 || align=left | — || 
|- id="2004 RD303" bgcolor=#d6d6d6
| 0 ||  || MBA-O || 16.97 || 2.2 km || multiple || 2004–2021 || 08 Nov 2021 || 63 || align=left | Alt.: 2012 BO38 || 
|- id="2004 RG303" bgcolor=#d6d6d6
| 0 ||  || MBA-O || 16.9 || 2.3 km || multiple || 2004–2020 || 14 Oct 2020 || 77 || align=left | —Added on 22 July 2020 || 
|- id="2004 RQ303" bgcolor=#fefefe
| 1 ||  || MBA-I || 18.1 || data-sort-value="0.71" | 710 m || multiple || 2004–2021 || 18 Jan 2021 || 59 || align=left | Alt.: 2008 UK328 || 
|- id="2004 RR303" bgcolor=#fefefe
| 0 ||  || MBA-I || 18.22 || data-sort-value="0.67" | 670 m || multiple || 2004–2021 || 31 Aug 2021 || 98 || align=left | Alt.: 2014 LK27 || 
|- id="2004 RT303" bgcolor=#d6d6d6
| 1 ||  || MBA-O || 17.66 || 1.6 km || multiple || 2004–2021 || 04 Nov 2021 || 22 || align=left | Alt.: 2015 TN12 || 
|- id="2004 RV303" bgcolor=#d6d6d6
| 1 ||  || MBA-O || 17.32 || 1.9 km || multiple || 2004–2021 || 27 Nov 2021 || 60 || align=left | — || 
|- id="2004 RW303" bgcolor=#d6d6d6
| 0 ||  || MBA-O || 16.8 || 2.4 km || multiple || 2004–2020 || 23 Oct 2020 || 57 || align=left | — || 
|- id="2004 RC304" bgcolor=#d6d6d6
| 1 ||  || MBA-O || 17.87 || 1.5 km || multiple || 2004–2021 || 26 Nov 2021 || 50 || align=left | — || 
|- id="2004 RF304" bgcolor=#d6d6d6
| 0 ||  || MBA-O || 17.42 || 1.8 km || multiple || 2004–2022 || 26 Jan 2022 || 71 || align=left | — || 
|- id="2004 RL304" bgcolor=#E9E9E9
| 0 ||  || MBA-M || 18.11 || 1.0 km || multiple || 2004–2021 || 05 Oct 2021 || 65 || align=left | — || 
|- id="2004 RO304" bgcolor=#fefefe
| 0 ||  || MBA-I || 18.57 || data-sort-value="0.57" | 570 m || multiple || 2004–2021 || 28 Oct 2021 || 87 || align=left | Alt.: 2014 QX87 || 
|- id="2004 RT304" bgcolor=#E9E9E9
| 0 ||  || MBA-M || 17.13 || 1.6 km || multiple || 1993–2021 || 08 Nov 2021 || 244 || align=left | Alt.: 2000 UJ77, 2006 BN156, 2010 CG138, 2010 HP75, 2013 XG18 || 
|- id="2004 RY304" bgcolor=#d6d6d6
| 0 ||  || MBA-O || 17.71 || 1.6 km || multiple || 2004–2021 || 28 Oct 2021 || 58 || align=left | Disc.: SpacewatchAdded on 30 September 2021Alt.: 2010 UW38 || 
|- id="2004 RC305" bgcolor=#d6d6d6
| 0 ||  || MBA-O || 17.20 || 2.0 km || multiple || 2004–2021 || 28 Oct 2021 || 71 || align=left | Disc.: SpacewatchAdded on 30 September 2021Alt.: 2015 ME184 || 
|- id="2004 RT305" bgcolor=#fefefe
| 0 ||  || MBA-I || 17.9 || data-sort-value="0.78" | 780 m || multiple || 2004–2020 || 02 Jan 2020 || 147 || align=left | — || 
|- id="2004 RH307" bgcolor=#E9E9E9
| 0 ||  || MBA-M || 17.8 || 1.5 km || multiple || 2004–2019 || 07 Jan 2019 || 64 || align=left | — || 
|- id="2004 RO307" bgcolor=#fefefe
| 0 ||  || MBA-I || 17.9 || data-sort-value="0.78" | 780 m || multiple || 2004–2021 || 18 Jan 2021 || 148 || align=left | — || 
|- id="2004 RN308" bgcolor=#E9E9E9
| 0 ||  || MBA-M || 17.37 || 1.4 km || multiple || 2004–2021 || 31 Oct 2021 || 123 || align=left | — || 
|- id="2004 RL310" bgcolor=#E9E9E9
| 0 ||  || MBA-M || 17.16 || 2.1 km || multiple || 2004–2021 || 11 May 2021 || 94 || align=left | — || 
|- id="2004 RX310" bgcolor=#E9E9E9
| 0 ||  || MBA-M || 16.8 || 1.8 km || multiple || 2004–2020 || 25 Mar 2020 || 110 || align=left | — || 
|- id="2004 RL311" bgcolor=#fefefe
| 0 ||  || MBA-I || 17.84 || data-sort-value="0.80" | 800 m || multiple || 2004–2021 || 11 Oct 2021 || 198 || align=left | — || 
|- id="2004 RO311" bgcolor=#fefefe
| 0 ||  || MBA-I || 18.20 || data-sort-value="0.68" | 680 m || multiple || 2004–2021 || 07 Feb 2021 || 112 || align=left | Alt.: 2014 EA71, 2015 PK2, 2015 TC162 || 
|- id="2004 RG312" bgcolor=#FA8072
| 0 ||  || MCA || 18.55 || data-sort-value="0.58" | 580 m || multiple || 2004–2021 || 05 Nov 2021 || 105 || align=left | — || 
|- id="2004 RO312" bgcolor=#FA8072
| 0 ||  || MCA || 18.48 || data-sort-value="0.60" | 600 m || multiple || 2000–2022 || 26 Jan 2022 || 74 || align=left | — || 
|- id="2004 RS312" bgcolor=#d6d6d6
| 0 ||  || MBA-O || 17.36 || 1.9 km || multiple || 2004–2022 || 04 Jan 2022 || 102 || align=left | — || 
|- id="2004 RC313" bgcolor=#fefefe
| 0 ||  || MBA-I || 18.86 || data-sort-value="0.50" | 500 m || multiple || 2004–2021 || 31 Oct 2021 || 80 || align=left | Alt.: 2011 UY191 || 
|- id="2004 RG313" bgcolor=#d6d6d6
| 0 ||  || MBA-O || 16.55 || 2.7 km || multiple || 2004–2022 || 21 Jan 2022 || 88 || align=left | Disc.: SpacewatchAdded on 17 January 2021 || 
|- id="2004 RK313" bgcolor=#fefefe
| 0 ||  || MBA-I || 18.2 || data-sort-value="0.68" | 680 m || multiple || 2004–2019 || 19 Nov 2019 || 60 || align=left | Alt.: 2015 VB23 || 
|- id="2004 RF314" bgcolor=#fefefe
| 2 ||  || MBA-I || 19.43 || data-sort-value="0.39" | 390 m || multiple || 2004–2022 || 06 Jan 2022 || 26 || align=left | — || 
|- id="2004 RL314" bgcolor=#fefefe
| 0 ||  || MBA-I || 17.54 || data-sort-value="0.92" | 920 m || multiple || 2004–2021 || 15 Apr 2021 || 153 || align=left | Alt.: 2011 OT30, 2015 TO22 || 
|- id="2004 RV314" bgcolor=#fefefe
| 0 ||  || MBA-I || 18.5 || data-sort-value="0.59" | 590 m || multiple || 2004–2019 || 27 Nov 2019 || 52 || align=left | —Added on 22 July 2020Alt.: 2015 RN158 || 
|- id="2004 RN315" bgcolor=#E9E9E9
| 0 ||  || MBA-M || 17.83 || 1.1 km || multiple || 2004–2021 || 06 Dec 2021 || 95 || align=left | Alt.: 2017 VV33 || 
|- id="2004 RU317" bgcolor=#d6d6d6
| 0 ||  || MBA-O || 17.25 || 2.0 km || multiple || 2004–2021 || 26 Nov 2021 || 61 || align=left | Alt.: 2015 TW210 || 
|- id="2004 RW317" bgcolor=#fefefe
| 1 ||  || HUN || 18.5 || data-sort-value="0.59" | 590 m || multiple || 2004–2020 || 13 Sep 2020 || 42 || align=left | — || 
|- id="2004 RJ318" bgcolor=#fefefe
| 0 ||  || MBA-I || 17.3 || 1.0 km || multiple || 2004–2021 || 18 Jan 2021 || 110 || align=left | — || 
|- id="2004 RL318" bgcolor=#fefefe
| 0 ||  || MBA-I || 18.2 || data-sort-value="0.68" | 680 m || multiple || 2004–2019 || 31 Dec 2019 || 67 || align=left | — || 
|- id="2004 RQ318" bgcolor=#fefefe
| 3 ||  || MBA-I || 18.9 || data-sort-value="0.49" | 490 m || multiple || 2004–2017 || 26 Aug 2017 || 27 || align=left | — || 
|- id="2004 RV318" bgcolor=#E9E9E9
| 0 ||  || MBA-M || 17.34 || 1.9 km || multiple || 2004–2021 || 11 May 2021 || 45 || align=left | — || 
|- id="2004 RA319" bgcolor=#E9E9E9
| 0 ||  || MBA-M || 18.27 || data-sort-value="0.66" | 660 m || multiple || 2000–2022 || 06 Jan 2022 || 81 || align=left | Disc.: SpacewatchAdded on 24 December 2021 || 
|- id="2004 RE320" bgcolor=#E9E9E9
| 0 ||  || MBA-M || 17.46 || 1.4 km || multiple || 2004–2021 || 27 Nov 2021 || 123 || align=left | Alt.: 2011 FP112 || 
|- id="2004 RC321" bgcolor=#FA8072
| 0 ||  || MCA || 18.6 || data-sort-value="0.57" | 570 m || multiple || 2004–2020 || 19 May 2020 || 42 || align=left | — || 
|- id="2004 RH321" bgcolor=#E9E9E9
| 0 ||  || MBA-M || 17.61 || 1.3 km || multiple || 2004–2021 || 03 Dec 2021 || 119 || align=left | — || 
|- id="2004 RR322" bgcolor=#E9E9E9
| 0 ||  || MBA-M || 17.60 || 1.3 km || multiple || 2000–2021 || 10 Nov 2021 || 178 || align=left | — || 
|- id="2004 RN324" bgcolor=#fefefe
| 0 ||  || MBA-I || 17.9 || data-sort-value="0.78" | 780 m || multiple || 2004–2020 || 15 Feb 2020 || 60 || align=left | — || 
|- id="2004 RA325" bgcolor=#E9E9E9
| 0 ||  || MBA-M || 17.2 || 2.0 km || multiple || 2004–2019 || 03 Jan 2019 || 62 || align=left | Alt.: 2013 VF7 || 
|- id="2004 RP326" bgcolor=#fefefe
| 3 ||  || MBA-I || 17.8 || data-sort-value="0.82" | 820 m || multiple || 2004–2018 || 12 Jul 2018 || 48 || align=left | — || 
|- id="2004 RT326" bgcolor=#E9E9E9
| 0 ||  || MBA-M || 17.59 || 1.3 km || multiple || 2004–2021 || 14 Jul 2021 || 40 || align=left | — || 
|- id="2004 RV326" bgcolor=#E9E9E9
| 0 ||  || MBA-M || 18.28 || data-sort-value="0.66" | 660 m || multiple || 2004–2020 || 16 Sep 2020 || 44 || align=left | — || 
|- id="2004 RW326" bgcolor=#d6d6d6
| 0 ||  || MBA-O || 16.27 || 3.1 km || multiple || 2004–2022 || 27 Jan 2022 || 170 || align=left | Alt.: 2014 UE211 || 
|- id="2004 RR327" bgcolor=#E9E9E9
| 0 ||  || MBA-M || 17.17 || 2.0 km || multiple || 2004–2021 || 09 May 2021 || 119 || align=left | — || 
|- id="2004 RT327" bgcolor=#E9E9E9
| 0 ||  || MBA-M || 16.8 || 2.4 km || multiple || 2004–2020 || 22 Mar 2020 || 123 || align=left | — || 
|- id="2004 RW327" bgcolor=#fefefe
| 0 ||  || MBA-I || 16.92 || 1.2 km || multiple || 2000–2021 || 02 Aug 2021 || 416 || align=left | — || 
|- id="2004 RD328" bgcolor=#E9E9E9
| 0 ||  || MBA-M || 17.78 || 1.2 km || multiple || 2004–2021 || 11 Sep 2021 || 49 || align=left | — || 
|- id="2004 RX328" bgcolor=#E9E9E9
| 0 ||  || MBA-M || 18.07 || 1.0 km || multiple || 2004–2021 || 09 Dec 2021 || 86 || align=left | — || 
|- id="2004 RA329" bgcolor=#E9E9E9
| 0 ||  || MBA-M || 18.30 || data-sort-value="0.92" | 920 m || multiple || 2004–2021 || 30 Nov 2021 || 70 || align=left | Disc.: SpacewatchAdded on 24 December 2021 || 
|- id="2004 RF329" bgcolor=#fefefe
| 0 ||  || MBA-I || 18.6 || data-sort-value="0.57" | 570 m || multiple || 2004–2020 || 19 Oct 2020 || 116 || align=left | — || 
|- id="2004 RU329" bgcolor=#fefefe
| 1 ||  || HUN || 17.8 || data-sort-value="0.82" | 820 m || multiple || 2003–2021 || 04 Jan 2021 || 59 || align=left | — || 
|- id="2004 RK330" bgcolor=#fefefe
| 0 ||  || MBA-I || 18.41 || data-sort-value="0.62" | 620 m || multiple || 2004–2021 || 17 Apr 2021 || 37 || align=left | Disc.: SpacewatchAdded on 17 June 2021 || 
|- id="2004 RM330" bgcolor=#fefefe
| 0 ||  || MBA-I || 19.09 || data-sort-value="0.45" | 450 m || multiple || 2004–2021 || 05 Oct 2021 || 58 || align=left | Disc.: SpacewatchAdded on 21 August 2021 || 
|- id="2004 RO330" bgcolor=#fefefe
| 0 ||  || MBA-I || 18.7 || data-sort-value="0.54" | 540 m || multiple || 2004–2020 || 08 Oct 2020 || 62 || align=left | Disc.: SpacewatchAdded on 19 October 2020Alt.: 2016 FM2 || 
|- id="2004 RU330" bgcolor=#E9E9E9
| 0 ||  || MBA-M || 18.0 || data-sort-value="0.75" | 750 m || multiple || 1996–2020 || 11 Oct 2020 || 70 || align=left | Disc.: SpacewatchAdded on 19 October 2020 || 
|- id="2004 RZ330" bgcolor=#fefefe
| 0 ||  || MBA-I || 18.91 || data-sort-value="0.49" | 490 m || multiple || 1997–2021 || 16 Apr 2021 || 35 || align=left | Alt.: 2015 XA264 || 
|- id="2004 RB331" bgcolor=#d6d6d6
| 0 ||  || MBA-O || 17.4 || 1.8 km || multiple || 2004–2019 || 27 Oct 2019 || 80 || align=left | — || 
|- id="2004 RD331" bgcolor=#d6d6d6
| 0 ||  || MBA-O || 16.9 || 2.3 km || multiple || 2004–2021 || 12 Jan 2021 || 101 || align=left | Alt.: 2009 SD141, 2016 CQ258 || 
|- id="2004 RX331" bgcolor=#E9E9E9
| 0 ||  || MBA-M || 16.80 || 1.8 km || multiple || 2000–2021 || 06 Nov 2021 || 195 || align=left | Alt.: 2015 BV432 || 
|- id="2004 RC332" bgcolor=#E9E9E9
| 0 ||  || MBA-M || 17.2 || 2.0 km || multiple || 2004–2019 || 08 Feb 2019 || 86 || align=left | Alt.: 2013 RS51 || 
|- id="2004 RK332" bgcolor=#E9E9E9
| 0 ||  || MBA-M || 16.3 || 2.3 km || multiple || 1982–2020 || 20 May 2020 || 160 || align=left | — || 
|- id="2004 RX334" bgcolor=#fefefe
| 1 ||  || MBA-I || 18.1 || data-sort-value="0.71" | 710 m || multiple || 2004–2021 || 13 May 2021 || 42 || align=left | Disc.: LONEOSAdded on 17 June 2021Alt.: 2018 UA4 || 
|- id="2004 RY336" bgcolor=#fefefe
| – ||  || MBA-I || 19.5 || data-sort-value="0.37" | 370 m || single || 27 days || 12 Oct 2004 || 15 || align=left | — || 
|- id="2004 RE337" bgcolor=#E9E9E9
| 1 ||  || MBA-M || 17.8 || data-sort-value="0.82" | 820 m || multiple || 2004–2020 || 21 Jul 2020 || 79 || align=left | — || 
|- id="2004 RL337" bgcolor=#fefefe
| 2 ||  || MBA-I || 18.6 || data-sort-value="0.57" | 570 m || multiple || 2004–2015 || 14 Nov 2015 || 32 || align=left | — || 
|- id="2004 RD338" bgcolor=#d6d6d6
| 0 ||  || MBA-O || 17.48 || 1.8 km || multiple || 2004–2022 || 22 Jan 2022 || 53 || align=left | — || 
|- id="2004 RM338" bgcolor=#E9E9E9
| 2 ||  || MBA-M || 18.0 || 1.1 km || multiple || 2004–2017 || 23 Oct 2017 || 21 || align=left | — || 
|- id="2004 RX338" bgcolor=#E9E9E9
| 0 ||  || MBA-M || 18.22 || data-sort-value="0.95" | 950 m || multiple || 1995–2021 || 31 Oct 2021 || 150 || align=left | Alt.: 2016 GR99 || 
|- id="2004 RY338" bgcolor=#fefefe
| 0 ||  || MBA-I || 18.3 || data-sort-value="0.65" | 650 m || multiple || 2004–2020 || 07 Dec 2020 || 189 || align=left | — || 
|- id="2004 RL339" bgcolor=#E9E9E9
| 0 ||  || MBA-M || 17.46 || 1.4 km || multiple || 2004–2021 || 22 May 2021 || 51 || align=left | Alt.: 2013 SC8 || 
|- id="2004 RD340" bgcolor=#E9E9E9
| 0 ||  || MBA-M || 17.1 || 2.1 km || multiple || 2004–2018 || 05 Oct 2018 || 59 || align=left | — || 
|- id="2004 RK340" bgcolor=#d6d6d6
| 0 ||  || MBA-O || 16.51 || 3.6 km || multiple || 2004–2021 || 07 Nov 2021 || 116 || align=left | Alt.: 2015 LE47 || 
|- id="2004 RN340" bgcolor=#d6d6d6
| 0 ||  || MBA-O || 17.0 || 2.2 km || multiple || 2004–2021 || 07 Jan 2021 || 55 || align=left | — || 
|- id="2004 RU340" bgcolor=#E9E9E9
| 0 ||  || MBA-M || 16.94 || 1.2 km || multiple || 2004–2022 || 05 Jan 2022 || 129 || align=left | — || 
|- id="2004 RC341" bgcolor=#d6d6d6
| – ||  || MBA-O || 16.5 || 2.8 km || single || 15 days || 23 Sep 2004 || 9 || align=left | — || 
|- id="2004 RK341" bgcolor=#E9E9E9
| 4 ||  || MBA-M || 17.5 || 1.3 km || multiple || 2004–2013 || 09 Nov 2013 || 22 || align=left | — || 
|- id="2004 RN341" bgcolor=#E9E9E9
| 1 ||  || MBA-M || 17.4 || 1.4 km || multiple || 2004–2017 || 19 Nov 2017 || 58 || align=left | — || 
|- id="2004 RR341" bgcolor=#fefefe
| 0 ||  || MBA-I || 18.50 || data-sort-value="0.59" | 590 m || multiple || 2004–2021 || 09 May 2021 || 169 || align=left | — || 
|- id="2004 RV341" bgcolor=#d6d6d6
| 0 ||  || MBA-O || 16.48 || 2.8 km || multiple || 2004–2021 || 11 Nov 2021 || 176 || align=left | — || 
|- id="2004 RX341" bgcolor=#d6d6d6
| 0 ||  || MBA-O || 16.83 || 2.4 km || multiple || 2004–2022 || 04 Jan 2022 || 91 || align=left | Alt.: 2012 BC177 || 
|- id="2004 RR342" bgcolor=#E9E9E9
| 1 ||  || MBA-M || 17.1 || 1.1 km || multiple || 2004–2020 || 06 Dec 2020 || 212 || align=left | — || 
|- id="2004 RE343" bgcolor=#E9E9E9
| 0 ||  || MBA-M || 17.81 || 1.2 km || multiple || 2004–2022 || 05 Jan 2022 || 145 || align=left | — || 
|- id="2004 RF343" bgcolor=#fefefe
| 1 ||  || MBA-I || 17.9 || data-sort-value="0.78" | 780 m || multiple || 2004–2016 || 08 Jan 2016 || 92 || align=left | — || 
|- id="2004 RH343" bgcolor=#FA8072
| 2 ||  || MCA || 18.7 || data-sort-value="0.54" | 540 m || multiple || 2004–2015 || 07 Dec 2015 || 45 || align=left | — || 
|- id="2004 RG344" bgcolor=#E9E9E9
| 0 ||  || MBA-M || 17.7 || data-sort-value="0.86" | 860 m || multiple || 2004–2020 || 20 Oct 2020 || 110 || align=left | — || 
|- id="2004 RM344" bgcolor=#d6d6d6
| 0 ||  || MBA-O || 16.6 || 2.7 km || multiple || 2002–2020 || 16 Nov 2020 || 97 || align=left | Alt.: 2008 LN3, 2013 GO122 || 
|- id="2004 RD345" bgcolor=#d6d6d6
| 0 ||  || MBA-O || 17.4 || 1.8 km || multiple || 2004–2020 || 21 Oct 2020 || 181 || align=left | — || 
|- id="2004 RF345" bgcolor=#d6d6d6
| 0 ||  || MBA-O || 16.76 || 2.5 km || multiple || 2004–2021 || 29 Nov 2021 || 88 || align=left | — || 
|- id="2004 RF346" bgcolor=#E9E9E9
| 0 ||  || MBA-M || 17.9 || 1.5 km || multiple || 2004–2018 || 04 Dec 2018 || 59 || align=left | Alt.: 2018 VH60 || 
|- id="2004 RR346" bgcolor=#FA8072
| 0 ||  || MCA || 18.08 || data-sort-value="0.72" | 720 m || multiple || 2004–2022 || 06 Jan 2022 || 205 || align=left | — || 
|- id="2004 RH347" bgcolor=#d6d6d6
| 4 ||  || MBA-O || 17.9 || 1.5 km || multiple || 2004–2021 || 13 Sep 2021 || 16 || align=left | Disc.: Mauna Kea Obs.Added on 29 January 2022 || 
|- id="2004 RN347" bgcolor=#E9E9E9
| 0 ||  || MBA-M || 17.30 || 1.9 km || multiple || 2003–2021 || 30 Jul 2021 || 119 || align=left | Alt.: 2013 SP2, 2016 ED128 || 
|- id="2004 RO347" bgcolor=#fefefe
| 0 ||  || MBA-I || 18.76 || data-sort-value="0.53" | 530 m || multiple || 2001–2021 || 04 Mar 2021 || 146 || align=left | Disc.: Mauna KeaAdded on 11 May 2021 || 
|- id="2004 RP347" bgcolor=#fefefe
| 0 ||  || MBA-I || 17.8 || data-sort-value="0.82" | 820 m || multiple || 2004–2020 || 20 Jan 2020 || 98 || align=left | Alt.: 2017 FX147 || 
|- id="2004 RU347" bgcolor=#fefefe
| 0 ||  || MBA-I || 18.6 || data-sort-value="0.57" | 570 m || multiple || 2004–2021 || 17 Jan 2021 || 55 || align=left | —Added on 22 July 2020Alt.: 2010 CA175 || 
|- id="2004 RA348" bgcolor=#fefefe
| 0 ||  || MBA-I || 19.83 || data-sort-value="0.32" | 320 m || multiple || 2003–2021 || 09 May 2021 || 31 || align=left | Alt.: 2011 RH7 || 
|- id="2004 RE348" bgcolor=#d6d6d6
| – ||  || MBA-O || 17.4 || 1.8 km || single || 12 days || 24 Sep 2004 || 9 || align=left | — || 
|- id="2004 RG348" bgcolor=#d6d6d6
| 0 ||  || MBA-O || 17.1 || 2.1 km || multiple || 2004–2021 || 12 Sep 2021 || 37 || align=left | Disc.: Mauna Kea Obs.Added on 30 September 2021Alt.: 2014 GR17, 2021 PD88 || 
|- id="2004 RM348" bgcolor=#E9E9E9
| 0 ||  || MBA-M || 17.6 || 1.7 km || multiple || 2004–2018 || 06 Oct 2018 || 35 || align=left | — || 
|- id="2004 RO348" bgcolor=#E9E9E9
| 0 ||  || MBA-M || 18.3 || data-sort-value="0.92" | 920 m || multiple || 2004–2020 || 22 Apr 2020 || 44 || align=left | —Added on 22 July 2020Alt.: 2015 DP5 || 
|- id="2004 RT348" bgcolor=#fefefe
| 0 ||  || MBA-I || 18.11 || data-sort-value="0.71" | 710 m || multiple || 2006–2021 || 14 Apr 2021 || 107 || align=left | Alt.: 2015 PT202 || 
|- id="2004 RA349" bgcolor=#d6d6d6
| 0 ||  || MBA-O || 17.1 || 2.1 km || multiple || 2004–2020 || 12 Nov 2020 || 75 || align=left | — || 
|- id="2004 RG349" bgcolor=#E9E9E9
| 0 ||  || MBA-M || 17.5 || 1.3 km || multiple || 2004–2021 || 30 Sep 2021 || 160 || align=left | — || 
|- id="2004 RU349" bgcolor=#d6d6d6
| 2 ||  || MBA-O || 17.9 || 1.5 km || multiple || 2004–2019 || 20 Oct 2019 || 28 || align=left | —Added on 22 July 2020 || 
|- id="2004 RA350" bgcolor=#E9E9E9
| 0 ||  || MBA-M || 17.19 || 1.5 km || multiple || 1993–2021 || 07 Aug 2021 || 117 || align=left | Alt.: 2010 BT125, 2015 CN61 || 
|- id="2004 RN350" bgcolor=#d6d6d6
| 3 ||  || MBA-O || 18.1 || 1.3 km || multiple || 2004–2020 || 23 Sep 2020 || 28 || align=left | Disc.: Mauna Kea Obs.Added on 17 January 2021Alt.: 2007 CR74 || 
|- id="2004 RQ350" bgcolor=#d6d6d6
| 0 ||  || MBA-O || 16.5 || 2.8 km || multiple || 2004–2019 || 17 Dec 2019 || 45 || align=left | — || 
|- id="2004 RG351" bgcolor=#E9E9E9
| 0 ||  || MBA-M || 17.87 || 1.1 km || multiple || 2000–2021 || 31 Aug 2021 || 103 || align=left | — || 
|- id="2004 RQ351" bgcolor=#d6d6d6
| 0 ||  || MBA-O || 17.98 || 1.4 km || multiple || 2004–2021 || 28 Nov 2021 || 32 || align=left | Disc.: Mauna Kea Obs.Added on 29 January 2022 || 
|- id="2004 RT351" bgcolor=#E9E9E9
| 0 ||  || MBA-M || 18.50 || data-sort-value="0.84" | 840 m || multiple || 2002–2021 || 26 Oct 2021 || 76 || align=left | — || 
|- id="2004 RY351" bgcolor=#d6d6d6
| 0 ||  || MBA-O || 17.77 || 1.6 km || multiple || 2004–2022 || 27 Jan 2022 || 38 || align=left | Disc.: Mauna Kea Obs.Added on 17 January 2021 || 
|- id="2004 RB352" bgcolor=#d6d6d6
| 2 ||  || MBA-O || 18.5 || 1.1 km || multiple || 2004–2021 || 18 Jan 2021 || 37 || align=left | — || 
|- id="2004 RG352" bgcolor=#d6d6d6
| 2 ||  || MBA-O || 18.07 || 1.4 km || multiple || 2004–2021 || 02 Dec 2021 || 32 || align=left | — || 
|- id="2004 RO352" bgcolor=#d6d6d6
| – ||  || MBA-O || 18.4 || 1.2 km || single || 29 days || 11 Oct 2004 || 6 || align=left | — || 
|- id="2004 RS352" bgcolor=#E9E9E9
| 1 ||  || MBA-M || 18.6 || data-sort-value="0.80" | 800 m || multiple || 2004–2019 || 04 Feb 2019 || 21 || align=left | — || 
|- id="2004 RA353" bgcolor=#E9E9E9
| 2 ||  || MBA-M || 18.9 || data-sort-value="0.70" | 700 m || multiple || 2004–2021 || 29 Oct 2021 || 31 || align=left | Disc.: SpacewatchAdded on 24 December 2021 || 
|- id="2004 RB353" bgcolor=#d6d6d6
| 0 ||  || MBA-O || 17.77 || 1.6 km || multiple || 2004–2022 || 07 Jan 2022 || 43 || align=left | — || 
|- id="2004 RG353" bgcolor=#E9E9E9
| 0 ||  || MBA-M || 18.3 || 1.2 km || multiple || 2004–2020 || 23 Jan 2020 || 37 || align=left | — || 
|- id="2004 RH353" bgcolor=#d6d6d6
| 4 ||  || MBA-O || 18.6 || 1.1 km || multiple || 2004–2020 || 15 Oct 2020 || 22 || align=left | Disc.: Mauna Kea Obs.Added on 19 October 2020 || 
|- id="2004 RJ353" bgcolor=#d6d6d6
| 2 ||  || MBA-O || 17.90 || 1.5 km || multiple || 2004–2021 || 30 Oct 2021 || 29 || align=left | Disc.: Mauna Kea Obs.Added on 5 November 2021 || 
|- id="2004 RN353" bgcolor=#fefefe
| – ||  || MBA-I || 19.5 || data-sort-value="0.37" | 370 m || single || 3 days || 14 Sep 2004 || 7 || align=left | — || 
|- id="2004 RR353" bgcolor=#d6d6d6
| – ||  || MBA-O || 17.5 || 1.8 km || single || 3 days || 14 Sep 2004 || 7 || align=left | — || 
|- id="2004 RU353" bgcolor=#fefefe
| 0 ||  || MBA-I || 18.11 || data-sort-value="0.71" | 710 m || multiple || 2003–2021 || 08 May 2021 || 98 || align=left | Alt.: 2014 GX41 || 
|- id="2004 RX353" bgcolor=#d6d6d6
| 0 ||  || MBA-O || 16.57 || 2.7 km || multiple || 2004–2021 || 27 Nov 2021 || 126 || align=left | Alt.: 2010 OE32, 2015 PY201 || 
|- id="2004 RB354" bgcolor=#fefefe
| 0 ||  || MBA-I || 18.6 || data-sort-value="0.57" | 570 m || multiple || 2004–2021 || 15 Apr 2021 || 40 || align=left | Disc.: SpacewatchAdded on 11 May 2021Alt.: 2021 GN22 || 
|- id="2004 RF354" bgcolor=#d6d6d6
| 0 ||  || MBA-O || 18.29 || 1.2 km || multiple || 2004–2021 || 10 Aug 2021 || 35 || align=left | — || 
|- id="2004 RG354" bgcolor=#E9E9E9
| 0 ||  || MBA-M || 18.12 || data-sort-value="0.71" | 710 m || multiple || 2000–2021 || 26 Oct 2021 || 95 || align=left | —Added on 22 July 2020Alt.: 2015 BK489 || 
|- id="2004 RK354" bgcolor=#E9E9E9
| 0 ||  || MBA-M || 18.08 || data-sort-value="0.72" | 720 m || multiple || 1996–2021 || 09 Nov 2021 || 60 || align=left | —Added on 22 July 2020Alt.: 2011 FR92 || 
|- id="2004 RM354" bgcolor=#E9E9E9
| 0 ||  || MBA-M || 18.50 || data-sort-value="0.84" | 840 m || multiple || 2004–2021 || 06 Nov 2021 || 68 || align=left | Disc.: SpacewatchAdded on 21 August 2021Alt.: 2017 UE120 || 
|- id="2004 RN354" bgcolor=#fefefe
| 0 ||  || MBA-I || 19.21 || data-sort-value="0.43" | 430 m || multiple || 2004–2021 || 02 Dec 2021 || 39 || align=left | — || 
|- id="2004 RO354" bgcolor=#E9E9E9
| 0 ||  || MBA-M || 18.76 || data-sort-value="0.53" | 530 m || multiple || 2004–2022 || 25 Jan 2022 || 71 || align=left | — || 
|- id="2004 RQ354" bgcolor=#E9E9E9
| – ||  || MBA-M || 18.6 || data-sort-value="0.80" | 800 m || single || 12 days || 23 Sep 2004 || 9 || align=left | — || 
|- id="2004 RL355" bgcolor=#d6d6d6
| 0 ||  || MBA-O || 17.14 || 2.1 km || multiple || 2013–2021 || 13 Sep 2021 || 50 || align=left | Disc.: Mauna Kea Obs.Added on 21 August 2021 || 
|- id="2004 RO356" bgcolor=#fefefe
| – ||  || MBA-I || 20.4 || data-sort-value="0.25" | 250 m || single || 12 days || 24 Sep 2004 || 9 || align=left | — || 
|- id="2004 RV356" bgcolor=#fefefe
| 3 ||  || MBA-I || 18.1 || data-sort-value="0.71" | 710 m || multiple || 2004–2016 || 22 Dec 2016 || 41 || align=left | Alt.: 2012 TF186 || 
|- id="2004 RG357" bgcolor=#E9E9E9
| 0 ||  || MBA-M || 17.94 || data-sort-value="0.77" | 770 m || multiple || 2000–2021 || 30 Nov 2021 || 107 || align=left | — || 
|- id="2004 RH357" bgcolor=#FFC2E0
| 8 ||  || APO || 23.28 || data-sort-value="0.078" | 78 m || single || 11 days || 22 Sep 2004 || 14 || align=left | — || 
|- id="2004 RN357" bgcolor=#d6d6d6
| 0 ||  || MBA-O || 16.62 || 2.6 km || multiple || 2004–2021 || 10 Nov 2021 || 158 || align=left | — || 
|- id="2004 RO357" bgcolor=#fefefe
| 0 ||  || MBA-I || 18.0 || data-sort-value="0.75" | 750 m || multiple || 2004–2020 || 16 Oct 2020 || 172 || align=left | — || 
|- id="2004 RP357" bgcolor=#fefefe
| 0 ||  || MBA-I || 17.94 || data-sort-value="0.77" | 770 m || multiple || 2004–2021 || 09 Jun 2021 || 90 || align=left | — || 
|- id="2004 RQ357" bgcolor=#d6d6d6
| 0 ||  || MBA-O || 16.68 || 2.6 km || multiple || 2004–2021 || 02 Oct 2021 || 103 || align=left | — || 
|- id="2004 RR357" bgcolor=#d6d6d6
| 0 ||  || MBA-O || 16.6 || 2.7 km || multiple || 2004–2020 || 12 Dec 2020 || 121 || align=left | — || 
|- id="2004 RU357" bgcolor=#fefefe
| 0 ||  || MBA-I || 18.0 || data-sort-value="0.75" | 750 m || multiple || 2004–2020 || 16 May 2020 || 84 || align=left | — || 
|- id="2004 RV357" bgcolor=#E9E9E9
| 0 ||  || MBA-M || 17.55 || 1.3 km || multiple || 2004–2021 || 11 Sep 2021 || 61 || align=left | — || 
|- id="2004 RW357" bgcolor=#d6d6d6
| 0 ||  || MBA-O || 16.30 || 3.1 km || multiple || 2004–2021 || 07 Nov 2021 || 120 || align=left | — || 
|- id="2004 RY357" bgcolor=#E9E9E9
| 1 ||  || MBA-M || 16.9 || 1.2 km || multiple || 1996–2020 || 06 Dec 2020 || 146 || align=left | — || 
|- id="2004 RA358" bgcolor=#fefefe
| 0 ||  || HUN || 18.5 || data-sort-value="0.59" | 590 m || multiple || 2004–2020 || 26 Dec 2020 || 71 || align=left | — || 
|- id="2004 RC358" bgcolor=#d6d6d6
| 0 ||  || MBA-O || 16.71 || 2.5 km || multiple || 2004–2021 || 05 Oct 2021 || 96 || align=left | — || 
|- id="2004 RD358" bgcolor=#E9E9E9
| 0 ||  || MBA-M || 17.04 || 2.2 km || multiple || 2004–2021 || 15 Apr 2021 || 92 || align=left | — || 
|- id="2004 RH358" bgcolor=#fefefe
| 0 ||  || MBA-I || 17.4 || data-sort-value="0.98" | 980 m || multiple || 2000–2018 || 07 Mar 2018 || 80 || align=left | Alt.: 2000 UG114 || 
|- id="2004 RJ358" bgcolor=#fefefe
| 0 ||  || MBA-I || 18.49 || data-sort-value="0.60" | 600 m || multiple || 2004–2021 || 08 Sep 2021 || 97 || align=left | — || 
|- id="2004 RK358" bgcolor=#E9E9E9
| 0 ||  || MBA-M || 17.58 || 1.3 km || multiple || 2004–2021 || 12 Jun 2021 || 64 || align=left | — || 
|- id="2004 RR358" bgcolor=#fefefe
| 0 ||  || MBA-I || 18.5 || data-sort-value="0.59" | 590 m || multiple || 2004–2020 || 22 Jun 2020 || 110 || align=left | — || 
|- id="2004 RS358" bgcolor=#fefefe
| 0 ||  || MBA-I || 17.87 || data-sort-value="0.79" | 790 m || multiple || 2004–2021 || 08 May 2021 || 66 || align=left | — || 
|- id="2004 RU358" bgcolor=#E9E9E9
| 0 ||  || MBA-M || 18.00 || data-sort-value="0.75" | 750 m || multiple || 2004–2022 || 25 Jan 2022 || 94 || align=left | — || 
|- id="2004 RV358" bgcolor=#d6d6d6
| 0 ||  || MBA-O || 16.4 || 2.9 km || multiple || 2004–2020 || 14 Oct 2020 || 97 || align=left | — || 
|- id="2004 RW358" bgcolor=#d6d6d6
| 0 ||  || MBA-O || 16.8 || 2.4 km || multiple || 2004–2021 || 15 Jan 2021 || 147 || align=left | — || 
|- id="2004 RX358" bgcolor=#fefefe
| 0 ||  || MBA-I || 17.8 || data-sort-value="0.82" | 820 m || multiple || 2004–2020 || 03 Feb 2020 || 78 || align=left | — || 
|- id="2004 RY358" bgcolor=#fefefe
| 2 ||  || MBA-I || 17.8 || data-sort-value="0.82" | 820 m || multiple || 2004–2021 || 04 Jan 2021 || 81 || align=left | — || 
|- id="2004 RZ358" bgcolor=#E9E9E9
| 0 ||  || MBA-M || 17.67 || 1.2 km || multiple || 2004–2021 || 30 Oct 2021 || 64 || align=left | — || 
|- id="2004 RA359" bgcolor=#d6d6d6
| 0 ||  || MBA-O || 16.4 || 2.9 km || multiple || 2004–2020 || 19 Apr 2020 || 73 || align=left | — || 
|- id="2004 RC359" bgcolor=#fefefe
| 0 ||  || MBA-I || 17.9 || data-sort-value="0.78" | 780 m || multiple || 2004–2021 || 07 Jun 2021 || 80 || align=left | — || 
|- id="2004 RD359" bgcolor=#d6d6d6
| 0 ||  || MBA-O || 16.9 || 2.3 km || multiple || 2004–2020 || 17 Dec 2020 || 68 || align=left | — || 
|- id="2004 RH359" bgcolor=#fefefe
| 0 ||  || MBA-I || 18.4 || data-sort-value="0.62" | 620 m || multiple || 2004–2020 || 22 Mar 2020 || 61 || align=left | — || 
|- id="2004 RL359" bgcolor=#E9E9E9
| 0 ||  || MBA-M || 17.4 || 1.8 km || multiple || 2004–2020 || 23 Jan 2020 || 51 || align=left | — || 
|- id="2004 RM359" bgcolor=#E9E9E9
| 1 ||  || MBA-M || 17.4 || data-sort-value="0.98" | 980 m || multiple || 2004–2020 || 21 Jul 2020 || 62 || align=left | — || 
|- id="2004 RO359" bgcolor=#fefefe
| 0 ||  || MBA-I || 18.49 || data-sort-value="0.60" | 600 m || multiple || 2004–2021 || 06 Apr 2021 || 73 || align=left | — || 
|- id="2004 RP359" bgcolor=#fefefe
| 0 ||  || MBA-I || 18.3 || data-sort-value="0.65" | 650 m || multiple || 2004–2015 || 19 Jul 2015 || 42 || align=left | — || 
|- id="2004 RR359" bgcolor=#E9E9E9
| 0 ||  || MBA-M || 17.77 || 1.2 km || multiple || 2004–2021 || 07 Nov 2021 || 78 || align=left | — || 
|- id="2004 RS359" bgcolor=#d6d6d6
| 0 ||  || MBA-O || 17.26 || 2.0 km || multiple || 2004–2022 || 25 Jan 2022 || 74 || align=left | — || 
|- id="2004 RV359" bgcolor=#fefefe
| 0 ||  || MBA-I || 18.72 || data-sort-value="0.54" | 540 m || multiple || 2004–2022 || 06 Jan 2022 || 59 || align=left | — || 
|- id="2004 RW359" bgcolor=#fefefe
| 0 ||  || MBA-I || 18.1 || data-sort-value="0.71" | 710 m || multiple || 2004–2019 || 28 Nov 2019 || 72 || align=left | — || 
|- id="2004 RX359" bgcolor=#fefefe
| 0 ||  || MBA-I || 18.4 || data-sort-value="0.62" | 620 m || multiple || 2004–2019 || 19 Nov 2019 || 64 || align=left | — || 
|- id="2004 RY359" bgcolor=#fefefe
| 0 ||  || MBA-I || 19.1 || data-sort-value="0.45" | 450 m || multiple || 2004–2020 || 21 Oct 2020 || 93 || align=left | — || 
|- id="2004 RZ359" bgcolor=#fefefe
| 0 ||  || MBA-I || 18.84 || data-sort-value="0.51" | 510 m || multiple || 2004–2021 || 09 Dec 2021 || 111 || align=left | — || 
|- id="2004 RA360" bgcolor=#E9E9E9
| 0 ||  || MBA-M || 17.55 || data-sort-value="0.92" | 920 m || multiple || 2004–2022 || 23 Jan 2022 || 44 || align=left | — || 
|- id="2004 RB360" bgcolor=#fefefe
| 0 ||  || MBA-I || 19.21 || data-sort-value="0.43" | 430 m || multiple || 2004–2022 || 27 Jan 2022 || 45 || align=left | — || 
|- id="2004 RC360" bgcolor=#fefefe
| 1 ||  || HUN || 18.7 || data-sort-value="0.54" | 540 m || multiple || 2004–2019 || 07 Oct 2019 || 44 || align=left | — || 
|- id="2004 RE360" bgcolor=#fefefe
| 0 ||  || MBA-I || 18.82 || data-sort-value="0.51" | 510 m || multiple || 2004–2021 || 13 Jul 2021 || 59 || align=left | — || 
|- id="2004 RF360" bgcolor=#E9E9E9
| 0 ||  || MBA-M || 17.84 || 1.5 km || multiple || 2004–2021 || 13 May 2021 || 46 || align=left | — || 
|- id="2004 RG360" bgcolor=#d6d6d6
| 0 ||  || MBA-O || 17.07 || 2.1 km || multiple || 2004–2022 || 27 Jan 2022 || 89 || align=left | — || 
|- id="2004 RH360" bgcolor=#d6d6d6
| 0 ||  || MBA-O || 17.01 || 2.2 km || multiple || 2004–2022 || 27 Jan 2022 || 70 || align=left | — || 
|- id="2004 RJ360" bgcolor=#E9E9E9
| 0 ||  || MBA-M || 17.34 || 1.9 km || multiple || 2004–2021 || 03 May 2021 || 38 || align=left | — || 
|- id="2004 RK360" bgcolor=#fefefe
| 0 ||  || MBA-I || 18.1 || data-sort-value="0.71" | 710 m || multiple || 2004–2019 || 28 Oct 2019 || 66 || align=left | — || 
|- id="2004 RL360" bgcolor=#fefefe
| 0 ||  || MBA-I || 18.0 || data-sort-value="0.75" | 750 m || multiple || 2004–2021 || 18 Jan 2021 || 66 || align=left | — || 
|- id="2004 RM360" bgcolor=#E9E9E9
| 0 ||  || MBA-M || 17.58 || 1.3 km || multiple || 2004–2021 || 08 May 2021 || 55 || align=left | — || 
|- id="2004 RN360" bgcolor=#fefefe
| 0 ||  || HUN || 18.80 || data-sort-value="0.52" | 520 m || multiple || 2004–2021 || 07 Apr 2021 || 57 || align=left | — || 
|- id="2004 RP360" bgcolor=#d6d6d6
| 0 ||  || MBA-O || 16.59 || 2.7 km || multiple || 2004–2021 || 07 Nov 2021 || 73 || align=left | — || 
|- id="2004 RR360" bgcolor=#fefefe
| 0 ||  || MBA-I || 18.5 || data-sort-value="0.59" | 590 m || multiple || 2004–2021 || 15 Jun 2021 || 50 || align=left | — || 
|- id="2004 RS360" bgcolor=#d6d6d6
| 0 ||  || MBA-O || 16.54 || 2.7 km || multiple || 2004–2021 || 07 Nov 2021 || 73 || align=left | — || 
|- id="2004 RT360" bgcolor=#d6d6d6
| 1 ||  || MBA-O || 17.2 || 2.0 km || multiple || 2004–2021 || 18 Jan 2021 || 57 || align=left | — || 
|- id="2004 RV360" bgcolor=#fefefe
| 1 ||  || MBA-I || 18.9 || data-sort-value="0.49" | 490 m || multiple || 2004–2019 || 08 Nov 2019 || 49 || align=left | — || 
|- id="2004 RW360" bgcolor=#fefefe
| 0 ||  || MBA-I || 19.42 || data-sort-value="0.39" | 390 m || multiple || 2004–2021 || 30 Nov 2021 || 76 || align=left | — || 
|- id="2004 RX360" bgcolor=#E9E9E9
| 0 ||  || MBA-M || 18.07 || 1.0 km || multiple || 2004–2021 || 09 Dec 2021 || 116 || align=left | — || 
|- id="2004 RZ360" bgcolor=#fefefe
| 2 ||  || MBA-I || 18.9 || data-sort-value="0.49" | 490 m || multiple || 2004–2017 || 23 Sep 2017 || 32 || align=left | — || 
|- id="2004 RA361" bgcolor=#E9E9E9
| 0 ||  || MBA-M || 18.21 || data-sort-value="0.96" | 960 m || multiple || 2004–2021 || 28 Oct 2021 || 84 || align=left | — || 
|- id="2004 RB361" bgcolor=#E9E9E9
| 0 ||  || MBA-M || 19.39 || data-sort-value="0.56" | 560 m || multiple || 2004–2021 || 03 Oct 2021 || 38 || align=left | — || 
|- id="2004 RC361" bgcolor=#FA8072
| 0 ||  || MCA || 19.2 || data-sort-value="0.43" | 430 m || multiple || 2004–2017 || 18 Aug 2017 || 29 || align=left | — || 
|- id="2004 RD361" bgcolor=#E9E9E9
| 1 ||  || MBA-M || 18.47 || data-sort-value="0.85" | 850 m || multiple || 2004–2021 || 01 Oct 2021 || 26 || align=left | — || 
|- id="2004 RE361" bgcolor=#fefefe
| 0 ||  || MBA-I || 18.1 || data-sort-value="0.71" | 710 m || multiple || 2004–2021 || 07 Jan 2021 || 65 || align=left | Alt.: 2019 LW12 || 
|- id="2004 RF361" bgcolor=#fefefe
| 3 ||  || MBA-I || 18.7 || data-sort-value="0.54" | 540 m || multiple || 2004–2015 || 07 Nov 2015 || 21 || align=left | — || 
|- id="2004 RG361" bgcolor=#fefefe
| 3 ||  || MBA-I || 19.8 || data-sort-value="0.33" | 330 m || multiple || 2004–2017 || 21 Sep 2017 || 16 || align=left | — || 
|- id="2004 RH361" bgcolor=#fefefe
| 0 ||  || MBA-I || 18.2 || data-sort-value="0.68" | 680 m || multiple || 2004–2019 || 28 Nov 2019 || 79 || align=left | — || 
|- id="2004 RJ361" bgcolor=#d6d6d6
| 0 ||  || MBA-O || 17.0 || 2.2 km || multiple || 2004–2021 || 15 Jan 2021 || 88 || align=left | — || 
|- id="2004 RK361" bgcolor=#E9E9E9
| 0 ||  || MBA-M || 17.2 || 2.0 km || multiple || 2004–2019 || 20 Dec 2019 || 94 || align=left | — || 
|- id="2004 RL361" bgcolor=#fefefe
| 0 ||  || MBA-I || 18.3 || data-sort-value="0.65" | 650 m || multiple || 1991–2020 || 19 Oct 2020 || 163 || align=left | — || 
|- id="2004 RM361" bgcolor=#d6d6d6
| 0 ||  || MBA-O || 17.2 || 2.0 km || multiple || 2004–2021 || 18 Jan 2021 || 84 || align=left | — || 
|- id="2004 RN361" bgcolor=#d6d6d6
| 1 ||  || MBA-O || 17.1 || 2.1 km || multiple || 2004–2019 || 02 Nov 2019 || 73 || align=left | — || 
|- id="2004 RO361" bgcolor=#d6d6d6
| 1 ||  || MBA-O || 17.4 || 1.8 km || multiple || 2004–2021 || 18 Jan 2021 || 74 || align=left | — || 
|- id="2004 RS361" bgcolor=#E9E9E9
| 0 ||  || MBA-M || 17.31 || 1.0 km || multiple || 2004–2021 || 08 Dec 2021 || 106 || align=left | Alt.: 2010 DZ70 || 
|- id="2004 RU361" bgcolor=#fefefe
| 1 ||  || HUN || 19.0 || data-sort-value="0.47" | 470 m || multiple || 2004–2021 || 15 Jun 2021 || 93 || align=left | — || 
|- id="2004 RV361" bgcolor=#d6d6d6
| 0 ||  || MBA-O || 16.8 || 2.4 km || multiple || 2004–2021 || 05 Jan 2021 || 64 || align=left | — || 
|- id="2004 RW361" bgcolor=#fefefe
| 0 ||  || MBA-I || 18.76 || data-sort-value="0.53" | 530 m || multiple || 2004–2021 || 11 Jun 2021 || 74 || align=left | — || 
|- id="2004 RX361" bgcolor=#d6d6d6
| 1 ||  || MBA-O || 17.4 || 1.8 km || multiple || 2004–2021 || 18 Jan 2021 || 65 || align=left | — || 
|- id="2004 RY361" bgcolor=#E9E9E9
| 0 ||  || MBA-M || 17.30 || 1.9 km || multiple || 2004–2021 || 13 May 2021 || 102 || align=left | — || 
|- id="2004 RZ361" bgcolor=#d6d6d6
| 0 ||  || MBA-O || 16.9 || 2.3 km || multiple || 2004–2020 || 11 Oct 2020 || 83 || align=left | — || 
|- id="2004 RA362" bgcolor=#fefefe
| 0 ||  || MBA-I || 18.3 || data-sort-value="0.65" | 650 m || multiple || 2004–2018 || 01 Nov 2018 || 54 || align=left | — || 
|- id="2004 RB362" bgcolor=#fefefe
| 0 ||  || MBA-I || 18.6 || data-sort-value="0.57" | 570 m || multiple || 2004–2020 || 18 Feb 2020 || 62 || align=left | Alt.: 2015 OX147, 2019 WG13 || 
|- id="2004 RC362" bgcolor=#fefefe
| 0 ||  || MBA-I || 18.4 || data-sort-value="0.62" | 620 m || multiple || 2004–2019 || 31 Oct 2019 || 58 || align=left | — || 
|- id="2004 RE362" bgcolor=#fefefe
| 0 ||  || MBA-I || 17.89 || data-sort-value="0.79" | 790 m || multiple || 2004–2022 || 26 Jan 2022 || 51 || align=left | — || 
|- id="2004 RF362" bgcolor=#fefefe
| 0 ||  || MBA-I || 17.9 || data-sort-value="0.78" | 780 m || multiple || 2004–2019 || 05 Oct 2019 || 50 || align=left | — || 
|- id="2004 RG362" bgcolor=#fefefe
| 0 ||  || MBA-I || 18.2 || data-sort-value="0.68" | 680 m || multiple || 2004–2020 || 27 Apr 2020 || 71 || align=left | — || 
|- id="2004 RH362" bgcolor=#FA8072
| 1 ||  || MCA || 18.2 || data-sort-value="0.68" | 680 m || multiple || 2004–2018 || 06 Jun 2018 || 51 || align=left | — || 
|- id="2004 RJ362" bgcolor=#fefefe
| 0 ||  || MBA-I || 18.1 || data-sort-value="0.71" | 710 m || multiple || 2004–2021 || 18 Jan 2021 || 58 || align=left | — || 
|- id="2004 RL362" bgcolor=#fefefe
| 0 ||  || MBA-I || 18.92 || data-sort-value="0.49" | 490 m || multiple || 2004–2021 || 14 May 2021 || 51 || align=left | — || 
|- id="2004 RM362" bgcolor=#E9E9E9
| 0 ||  || MBA-M || 17.62 || 1.7 km || multiple || 2004–2021 || 15 Apr 2021 || 44 || align=left | — || 
|- id="2004 RN362" bgcolor=#E9E9E9
| 0 ||  || MBA-M || 17.6 || 1.7 km || multiple || 2004–2018 || 07 Nov 2018 || 42 || align=left | — || 
|- id="2004 RP362" bgcolor=#fefefe
| 0 ||  || MBA-I || 18.77 || data-sort-value="0.52" | 520 m || multiple || 2004–2021 || 11 May 2021 || 45 || align=left | — || 
|- id="2004 RQ362" bgcolor=#E9E9E9
| 0 ||  || MBA-M || 17.94 || 1.1 km || multiple || 2004–2021 || 07 Jun 2021 || 53 || align=left | — || 
|- id="2004 RR362" bgcolor=#fefefe
| 0 ||  || MBA-I || 18.2 || data-sort-value="0.68" | 680 m || multiple || 2004–2019 || 03 Oct 2019 || 39 || align=left | — || 
|- id="2004 RS362" bgcolor=#fefefe
| 2 ||  || MBA-I || 18.6 || data-sort-value="0.57" | 570 m || multiple || 2004–2018 || 13 Nov 2018 || 42 || align=left | — || 
|- id="2004 RT362" bgcolor=#fefefe
| 0 ||  || MBA-I || 17.9 || data-sort-value="0.78" | 780 m || multiple || 2004–2020 || 22 Mar 2020 || 49 || align=left | — || 
|- id="2004 RU362" bgcolor=#d6d6d6
| 0 ||  || MBA-O || 17.0 || 2.2 km || multiple || 2004–2019 || 24 Apr 2019 || 43 || align=left | — || 
|- id="2004 RV362" bgcolor=#fefefe
| 0 ||  || MBA-I || 18.5 || data-sort-value="0.59" | 590 m || multiple || 2004–2019 || 22 Sep 2019 || 41 || align=left | — || 
|- id="2004 RW362" bgcolor=#d6d6d6
| 3 ||  || MBA-O || 18.3 || 1.2 km || multiple || 2004–2019 || 28 Oct 2019 || 39 || align=left | — || 
|- id="2004 RX362" bgcolor=#E9E9E9
| 0 ||  || MBA-M || 17.94 || 1.4 km || multiple || 2004–2021 || 07 Apr 2021 || 42 || align=left | — || 
|- id="2004 RY362" bgcolor=#d6d6d6
| 0 ||  || HIL || 16.3 || 3.1 km || multiple || 2004–2020 || 21 Oct 2020 || 111 || align=left | — || 
|- id="2004 RZ362" bgcolor=#E9E9E9
| 0 ||  || MBA-M || 17.7 || 1.6 km || multiple || 1995–2018 || 13 Sep 2018 || 42 || align=left | — || 
|- id="2004 RA363" bgcolor=#fefefe
| 0 ||  || MBA-I || 18.88 || data-sort-value="0.50" | 500 m || multiple || 2004–2021 || 07 Apr 2021 || 52 || align=left | — || 
|- id="2004 RB363" bgcolor=#fefefe
| 0 ||  || MBA-I || 19.1 || data-sort-value="0.45" | 450 m || multiple || 2004–2019 || 27 Nov 2019 || 44 || align=left | — || 
|- id="2004 RC363" bgcolor=#E9E9E9
| 0 ||  || MBA-M || 17.6 || 1.7 km || multiple || 2004–2020 || 01 Feb 2020 || 49 || align=left | — || 
|- id="2004 RD363" bgcolor=#fefefe
| 1 ||  || HUN || 19.1 || data-sort-value="0.45" | 450 m || multiple || 2004–2021 || 15 Jan 2021 || 48 || align=left | — || 
|- id="2004 RE363" bgcolor=#fefefe
| 0 ||  || MBA-I || 19.28 || data-sort-value="0.41" | 410 m || multiple || 2004–2021 || 07 Sep 2021 || 36 || align=left | — || 
|- id="2004 RF363" bgcolor=#fefefe
| 1 ||  || MBA-I || 18.8 || data-sort-value="0.52" | 520 m || multiple || 2004–2019 || 27 Oct 2019 || 32 || align=left | — || 
|- id="2004 RG363" bgcolor=#E9E9E9
| 2 ||  || MBA-M || 18.1 || 1.3 km || multiple || 2004–2018 || 12 Nov 2018 || 28 || align=left | — || 
|- id="2004 RH363" bgcolor=#E9E9E9
| 0 ||  || MBA-M || 17.7 || 1.6 km || multiple || 2004–2018 || 06 Oct 2018 || 40 || align=left | — || 
|- id="2004 RJ363" bgcolor=#fefefe
| 3 ||  || MBA-I || 18.7 || data-sort-value="0.54" | 540 m || multiple || 2004–2019 || 21 Sep 2019 || 23 || align=left | — || 
|- id="2004 RK363" bgcolor=#E9E9E9
| 0 ||  || MBA-M || 18.0 || 1.4 km || multiple || 2004–2020 || 16 Mar 2020 || 42 || align=left | — || 
|- id="2004 RL363" bgcolor=#E9E9E9
| 0 ||  || MBA-M || 18.16 || data-sort-value="0.69" | 690 m || multiple || 1996–2021 || 11 Nov 2021 || 90 || align=left | Alt.: 1996 XR7 || 
|- id="2004 RM363" bgcolor=#fefefe
| 0 ||  || MBA-I || 17.38 || data-sort-value="0.99" | 990 m || multiple || 2003–2022 || 26 Jan 2022 || 105 || align=left | — || 
|- id="2004 RN363" bgcolor=#E9E9E9
| 0 ||  || MBA-M || 16.71 || 1.9 km || multiple || 2004–2021 || 09 Nov 2021 || 255 || align=left | — || 
|- id="2004 RO363" bgcolor=#d6d6d6
| 0 ||  || MBA-O || 16.89 || 2.3 km || multiple || 1994–2022 || 26 Jan 2022 || 126 || align=left | — || 
|- id="2004 RP363" bgcolor=#E9E9E9
| 0 ||  || MBA-M || 17.49 || 1.8 km || multiple || 1995–2021 || 14 Apr 2021 || 89 || align=left | Alt.: 1995 SX64 || 
|- id="2004 RQ363" bgcolor=#d6d6d6
| 0 ||  || MBA-O || 16.8 || 2.4 km || multiple || 1993–2020 || 17 Oct 2020 || 130 || align=left | — || 
|- id="2004 RR363" bgcolor=#d6d6d6
| 0 ||  || MBA-O || 17.10 || 2.1 km || multiple || 2004–2021 || 07 Nov 2021 || 81 || align=left | — || 
|- id="2004 RS363" bgcolor=#fefefe
| 0 ||  || MBA-I || 18.29 || data-sort-value="0.65" | 650 m || multiple || 2004–2021 || 11 Jun 2021 || 102 || align=left | — || 
|- id="2004 RU363" bgcolor=#d6d6d6
| 0 ||  || MBA-O || 17.05 || 2.2 km || multiple || 2004–2021 || 09 Nov 2021 || 69 || align=left | — || 
|- id="2004 RV363" bgcolor=#d6d6d6
| 0 ||  || MBA-O || 17.2 || 2.0 km || multiple || 2004–2019 || 26 Sep 2019 || 43 || align=left | — || 
|- id="2004 RW363" bgcolor=#E9E9E9
| 0 ||  || MBA-M || 17.4 || 1.4 km || multiple || 2004–2020 || 27 Apr 2020 || 53 || align=left | — || 
|- id="2004 RZ363" bgcolor=#d6d6d6
| 0 ||  || MBA-O || 16.8 || 2.4 km || multiple || 2004–2020 || 17 Nov 2020 || 124 || align=left | — || 
|- id="2004 RB364" bgcolor=#fefefe
| 0 ||  || MBA-I || 18.1 || data-sort-value="0.71" | 710 m || multiple || 2004–2018 || 05 Oct 2018 || 38 || align=left | — || 
|- id="2004 RC364" bgcolor=#fefefe
| 1 ||  || MBA-I || 18.5 || data-sort-value="0.59" | 590 m || multiple || 2004–2019 || 27 Oct 2019 || 38 || align=left | — || 
|- id="2004 RD364" bgcolor=#d6d6d6
| 3 ||  || MBA-O || 17.8 || 1.5 km || multiple || 2004–2019 || 29 Jul 2019 || 26 || align=left | — || 
|- id="2004 RE364" bgcolor=#d6d6d6
| 0 ||  || MBA-O || 17.3 || 1.9 km || multiple || 2004–2019 || 03 Dec 2019 || 68 || align=left | — || 
|- id="2004 RF364" bgcolor=#fefefe
| 0 ||  || MBA-I || 19.61 || data-sort-value="0.36" | 360 m || multiple || 2004–2021 || 30 Nov 2021 || 69 || align=left | — || 
|- id="2004 RG364" bgcolor=#fefefe
| 0 ||  || MBA-I || 18.8 || data-sort-value="0.52" | 520 m || multiple || 2004–2020 || 15 Oct 2020 || 70 || align=left | — || 
|- id="2004 RH364" bgcolor=#fefefe
| 0 ||  || MBA-I || 18.49 || data-sort-value="0.60" | 600 m || multiple || 2004–2021 || 09 Nov 2021 || 96 || align=left | — || 
|- id="2004 RK364" bgcolor=#fefefe
| 0 ||  || MBA-I || 18.4 || data-sort-value="0.62" | 620 m || multiple || 2004–2020 || 26 Jan 2020 || 32 || align=left | — || 
|- id="2004 RL364" bgcolor=#fefefe
| 2 ||  || MBA-I || 19.9 || data-sort-value="0.31" | 310 m || multiple || 2004–2014 || 19 Sep 2014 || 19 || align=left | — || 
|- id="2004 RM364" bgcolor=#fefefe
| 0 ||  || MBA-I || 17.84 || data-sort-value="0.80" | 800 m || multiple || 1997–2021 || 08 May 2021 || 127 || align=left | — || 
|- id="2004 RN364" bgcolor=#d6d6d6
| 0 ||  || MBA-O || 16.9 || 2.3 km || multiple || 2004–2019 || 29 Oct 2019 || 64 || align=left | — || 
|- id="2004 RO364" bgcolor=#fefefe
| 0 ||  || MBA-I || 18.39 || data-sort-value="0.62" | 620 m || multiple || 2004–2021 || 12 May 2021 || 62 || align=left | — || 
|- id="2004 RP364" bgcolor=#E9E9E9
| 0 ||  || MBA-M || 17.3 || 1.9 km || multiple || 2004–2019 || 20 Dec 2019 || 63 || align=left | — || 
|- id="2004 RQ364" bgcolor=#E9E9E9
| 0 ||  || MBA-M || 17.55 || 1.7 km || multiple || 1995–2021 || 08 May 2021 || 80 || align=left | — || 
|- id="2004 RR364" bgcolor=#d6d6d6
| 0 ||  || MBA-O || 17.4 || 1.8 km || multiple || 2004–2019 || 19 Dec 2019 || 51 || align=left | — || 
|- id="2004 RS364" bgcolor=#fefefe
| 0 ||  || MBA-I || 18.7 || data-sort-value="0.54" | 540 m || multiple || 2004–2020 || 22 Jan 2020 || 53 || align=left | — || 
|- id="2004 RT364" bgcolor=#fefefe
| 0 ||  || MBA-I || 17.9 || data-sort-value="0.78" | 780 m || multiple || 2004–2020 || 23 Dec 2020 || 53 || align=left | — || 
|- id="2004 RU364" bgcolor=#E9E9E9
| 0 ||  || MBA-M || 17.27 || 2.0 km || multiple || 2004–2021 || 12 Jun 2021 || 90 || align=left | — || 
|- id="2004 RV364" bgcolor=#d6d6d6
| 0 ||  || MBA-O || 16.75 || 2.5 km || multiple || 2004–2021 || 15 Apr 2021 || 42 || align=left | — || 
|- id="2004 RW364" bgcolor=#d6d6d6
| 0 ||  || MBA-O || 17.6 || 1.7 km || multiple || 2004–2019 || 19 Dec 2019 || 47 || align=left | — || 
|- id="2004 RX364" bgcolor=#E9E9E9
| 0 ||  || MBA-M || 18.0 || 1.1 km || multiple || 2004–2017 || 16 Aug 2017 || 50 || align=left | — || 
|- id="2004 RY364" bgcolor=#fefefe
| 0 ||  || MBA-I || 18.8 || data-sort-value="0.52" | 520 m || multiple || 2004–2019 || 26 Sep 2019 || 43 || align=left | — || 
|- id="2004 RA365" bgcolor=#d6d6d6
| 0 ||  || MBA-O || 17.5 || 1.8 km || multiple || 2004–2019 || 27 Oct 2019 || 30 || align=left | — || 
|- id="2004 RB365" bgcolor=#d6d6d6
| 0 ||  || MBA-O || 16.8 || 2.4 km || multiple || 2004–2020 || 06 Dec 2020 || 78 || align=left | — || 
|- id="2004 RC365" bgcolor=#E9E9E9
| 0 ||  || MBA-M || 18.1 || 1.3 km || multiple || 1995–2021 || 11 Jun 2021 || 38 || align=left | — || 
|- id="2004 RD365" bgcolor=#E9E9E9
| 0 ||  || MBA-M || 18.68 || data-sort-value="0.77" | 770 m || multiple || 2004–2021 || 09 Aug 2021 || 42 || align=left | — || 
|- id="2004 RE365" bgcolor=#d6d6d6
| 0 ||  || MBA-O || 16.97 || 2.2 km || multiple || 2004–2021 || 28 Nov 2021 || 59 || align=left | —Added on 22 July 2020 || 
|- id="2004 RF365" bgcolor=#E9E9E9
| 0 ||  || MBA-M || 17.6 || 1.7 km || multiple || 2004–2020 || 02 Feb 2020 || 64 || align=left | —Added on 22 July 2020 || 
|- id="2004 RG365" bgcolor=#fefefe
| 2 ||  || MBA-I || 18.5 || data-sort-value="0.59" | 590 m || multiple || 2003–2016 || 01 Dec 2016 || 35 || align=left | —Added on 22 July 2020 || 
|- id="2004 RJ365" bgcolor=#FA8072
| 3 ||  || MCA || 20.2 || data-sort-value="0.27" | 270 m || multiple || 2004–2018 || 02 Nov 2018 || 30 || align=left | —Added on 22 July 2020 || 
|- id="2004 RK365" bgcolor=#FA8072
| 0 ||  || MCA || 19.34 || data-sort-value="0.40" | 400 m || multiple || 2004–2021 || 08 May 2021 || 40 || align=left | —Added on 22 July 2020 || 
|- id="2004 RL365" bgcolor=#E9E9E9
| 0 ||  || MBA-M || 18.38 || data-sort-value="0.63" | 630 m || multiple || 2000–2021 || 28 Nov 2021 || 40 || align=left | —Added on 22 July 2020 || 
|- id="2004 RM365" bgcolor=#E9E9E9
| 2 ||  || MBA-M || 18.2 || data-sort-value="0.68" | 680 m || multiple || 2004–2020 || 17 Aug 2020 || 45 || align=left | Disc.: SpacewatchAdded on 19 October 2020 || 
|- id="2004 RN365" bgcolor=#E9E9E9
| 2 ||  || MBA-M || 18.1 || data-sort-value="0.71" | 710 m || multiple || 2004–2020 || 11 Oct 2020 || 53 || align=left | Disc.: SpacewatchAdded on 19 October 2020 || 
|- id="2004 RP365" bgcolor=#E9E9E9
| 1 ||  || MBA-M || 18.8 || data-sort-value="0.52" | 520 m || multiple || 2004–2020 || 14 Sep 2020 || 45 || align=left | Disc.: SpacewatchAdded on 19 October 2020 || 
|- id="2004 RQ365" bgcolor=#d6d6d6
| 0 ||  || MBA-O || 16.8 || 2.4 km || multiple || 2002–2020 || 16 Oct 2020 || 74 || align=left | Disc.: SpacewatchAdded on 19 October 2020 || 
|- id="2004 RR365" bgcolor=#fefefe
| 0 ||  || MBA-I || 19.25 || data-sort-value="0.42" | 420 m || multiple || 2004–2021 || 13 Jul 2021 || 45 || align=left | Disc.: SpacewatchAdded on 19 October 2020 || 
|- id="2004 RS365" bgcolor=#fefefe
| 2 ||  || MBA-I || 19.1 || data-sort-value="0.45" | 450 m || multiple || 2004–2018 || 06 Oct 2018 || 36 || align=left | Disc.: SpacewatchAdded on 19 October 2020 || 
|- id="2004 RT365" bgcolor=#d6d6d6
| 0 ||  || MBA-O || 17.46 || 1.8 km || multiple || 2004–2021 || 13 Oct 2021 || 32 || align=left | Disc.: SpacewatchAdded on 19 October 2020 || 
|- id="2004 RU365" bgcolor=#E9E9E9
| 0 ||  || MBA-M || 18.23 || data-sort-value="0.95" | 950 m || multiple || 2004–2021 || 30 Aug 2021 || 58 || align=left | Disc.: Pan-STARRSAdded on 19 October 2020 || 
|- id="2004 RV365" bgcolor=#d6d6d6
| 1 ||  || MBA-O || 17.6 || 1.7 km || multiple || 2004–2020 || 12 Sep 2020 || 31 || align=left | Disc.: SpacewatchAdded on 19 October 2020 || 
|- id="2004 RW365" bgcolor=#E9E9E9
| 2 ||  || MBA-M || 18.0 || data-sort-value="0.75" | 750 m || multiple || 2000–2020 || 14 Aug 2020 || 23 || align=left | Disc.: SpacewatchAdded on 19 October 2020 || 
|- id="2004 RX365" bgcolor=#E9E9E9
| 0 ||  || MBA-M || 18.03 || 1.0 km || multiple || 2004–2021 || 26 Oct 2021 || 73 || align=left | Disc.: SpacewatchAdded on 19 October 2020 || 
|- id="2004 RY365" bgcolor=#fefefe
| 1 ||  || MBA-I || 19.5 || data-sort-value="0.37" | 370 m || multiple || 2000–2019 || 25 Apr 2019 || 28 || align=left | Disc.: LPL/Spacewatch IIAdded on 17 January 2021 || 
|- id="2004 RZ365" bgcolor=#d6d6d6
| 0 ||  || MBA-O || 16.8 || 2.4 km || multiple || 2002–2020 || 22 Oct 2020 || 80 || align=left | Disc.: LPL/Spacewatch IIAdded on 17 January 2021 || 
|- id="2004 RA366" bgcolor=#d6d6d6
| 1 ||  || MBA-O || 17.1 || 2.1 km || multiple || 2004–2020 || 14 Sep 2020 || 52 || align=left | Disc.: SpacewatchAdded on 17 January 2021 || 
|- id="2004 RC366" bgcolor=#d6d6d6
| 0 ||  || MBA-O || 17.7 || 1.6 km || multiple || 2004–2021 || 07 Feb 2021 || 45 || align=left | Disc.: SpacewatchAdded on 17 January 2021 || 
|- id="2004 RF366" bgcolor=#E9E9E9
| 0 ||  || MBA-M || 18.66 || data-sort-value="0.55" | 550 m || multiple || 2000–2021 || 30 Nov 2021 || 51 || align=left | Disc.: SpacewatchAdded on 9 March 2021 || 
|- id="2004 RG366" bgcolor=#d6d6d6
| 1 ||  || MBA-O || 17.2 || 2.0 km || multiple || 2004–2020 || 07 Dec 2020 || 27 || align=left | Disc.: SpacewatchAdded on 11 May 2021 || 
|- id="2004 RH366" bgcolor=#fefefe
| 0 ||  || MBA-I || 18.85 || data-sort-value="0.50" | 500 m || multiple || 2004–2021 || 07 Jun 2021 || 66 || align=left | Disc.: Pan-STARRS 1Added on 11 May 2021 || 
|- id="2004 RJ366" bgcolor=#E9E9E9
| 0 ||  || MBA-M || 18.3 || 1.2 km || multiple || 2004–2021 || 08 Apr 2021 || 29 || align=left | Disc.: Pan-STARRS 1Added on 11 May 2021 || 
|- id="2004 RK366" bgcolor=#E9E9E9
| 0 ||  || MBA-M || 17.5 || 1.8 km || multiple || 2004–2018 || 14 Aug 2018 || 34 || align=left | Disc.: SpacewatchAdded on 17 June 2021 || 
|- id="2004 RL366" bgcolor=#E9E9E9
| 0 ||  || MBA-M || 17.9 || 1.5 km || multiple || 2004–2018 || 05 Oct 2018 || 28 || align=left | Disc.: SpacewatchAdded on 17 June 2021 || 
|- id="2004 RM366" bgcolor=#fefefe
| 1 ||  || MBA-I || 18.9 || data-sort-value="0.49" | 490 m || multiple || 2004–2015 || 10 Oct 2015 || 19 || align=left | Disc.: SpacewatchAdded on 21 August 2021 || 
|- id="2004 RO366" bgcolor=#fefefe
| 0 ||  || MBA-I || 18.54 || data-sort-value="0.58" | 580 m || multiple || 2004–2019 || 26 Sep 2019 || 39 || align=left | Disc.: MLSAdded on 21 August 2021 || 
|- id="2004 RP366" bgcolor=#E9E9E9
| 0 ||  || MBA-M || 19.11 || data-sort-value="0.63" | 630 m || multiple || 2004–2021 || 07 Nov 2021 || 53 || align=left | Disc.: SpacewatchAdded on 30 September 2021 || 
|- id="2004 RQ366" bgcolor=#d6d6d6
| 0 ||  || MBA-O || 17.46 || 1.8 km || multiple || 2004–2021 || 06 Oct 2021 || 38 || align=left | Disc.: Kitt Peak Obs.Added on 5 November 2021 || 
|- id="2004 RR366" bgcolor=#d6d6d6
| 0 ||  || MBA-O || 17.09 || 2.1 km || multiple || 2004–2021 || 28 Nov 2021 || 63 || align=left | Disc.: SpacewatchAdded on 5 November 2021 || 
|- id="2004 RS366" bgcolor=#d6d6d6
| 0 ||  || MBA-O || 17.9 || 1.5 km || multiple || 2004–2021 || 10 Oct 2021 || 40 || align=left | Disc.: SpacewatchAdded on 5 November 2021 || 
|- id="2004 RT366" bgcolor=#fefefe
| 0 ||  || MBA-I || 19.30 || data-sort-value="0.41" | 410 m || multiple || 2004–2022 || 05 Jan 2022 || 70 || align=left | Disc.: SpacewatchAdded on 5 November 2021 || 
|- id="2004 RU366" bgcolor=#E9E9E9
| 0 ||  || MBA-M || 17.91 || data-sort-value="0.78" | 780 m || multiple || 2004–2021 || 09 Dec 2021 || 63 || align=left | Disc.: SpacewatchAdded on 24 December 2021 || 
|- id="2004 RV366" bgcolor=#E9E9E9
| 2 ||  || MBA-M || 17.9 || data-sort-value="0.78" | 780 m || multiple || 2004–2021 || 24 Nov 2021 || 21 || align=left | Disc.: SpacewatchAdded on 24 December 2021 || 
|- id="2004 RW366" bgcolor=#fefefe
| 1 ||  || MBA-I || 18.5 || data-sort-value="0.59" | 590 m || multiple || 2004–2018 || 30 Sep 2018 || 32 || align=left | Disc.: SpacewatchAdded on 24 December 2021 || 
|- id="2004 RX366" bgcolor=#E9E9E9
| 2 ||  || MBA-M || 17.7 || 1.6 km || multiple || 2004–2018 || 08 Nov 2018 || 29 || align=left | Disc.: NEATAdded on 24 December 2021 || 
|- id="2004 RY366" bgcolor=#E9E9E9
| 0 ||  || MBA-M || 18.4 || data-sort-value="0.62" | 620 m || multiple || 2004–2021 || 26 Nov 2021 || 28 || align=left | Disc.: SpacewatchAdded on 24 December 2021 || 
|- id="2004 RZ366" bgcolor=#E9E9E9
| 1 ||  || MBA-M || 19.0 || data-sort-value="0.67" | 670 m || multiple || 2004–2021 || 02 Oct 2021 || 27 || align=left | Disc.: No observationsAdded on 29 January 2022 || 
|}
back to top

References 
 

Lists of unnumbered minor planets